This is a list of notable Parsis. The Parsis constitute one of the two Zoroastrian communities of the Indian subcontinent, the other being Irani.


In science and industry

 Aban Pestonjee: Sri Lankan entrepreneur 
 Adi Bulsara (born 1952): physicist
 Adi Kanga (1923–2013): Indian Civil engineer, planned city of Navi Mumbai and Vashi bridge
 Ardaseer Cursetjee (1808–1877) of the Wadia shipbuilding family: first Indian elected Fellow of the Royal Society
 Ardeshir Darabshaw Shroff (1899–1965): Indian economist; delegate at the 1944 Bretton Woods Conference; co-author of the Bombay Plan; founder-director of the Investment Corporation of India; first Indian chairman of the Bank of India
 Ardeshir Godrej (1868–1936): Indian inventor; co-founder (with his brother Piroj) of the Godrej industries which does not include Godrej & Boyce, His son now runs Godrej Properties an aggregator model based real estate development firm. 
 Avabai Jamsetjee Jeejeebhoy (born c. 1793) Lady: continued her husband Sir Jamsetji Jeejeebhoy philanthropic work; builder of Mahim Causeway, connects two islands of Bombay and Salsette (north Bombay)
 Byram Dinshawji Avari (born 1942): Pakistan hotelier; founder and chairman of the Avari Group of companies
 Dinshaw Patel: Professor at Memorial Sloan Kettering; member of the National Academy of Sciences
 Zubin Damania (born 1973), physician, comedian, internet personality, musician, and founder of Turntable Health
 Byramjee Jeejeebhoy (1822–1890) Esq., CSI: Indian philanthropist and founder of B.J. Medical College, Pune
 Cowasjee Jehangir, Sir (1879–1962): Indian civil engineer; master constructor of Bombay
 Cowasji Shavaksha Dinshaw (Adenwalla) (1827–1900): Indian entrepreneur
 Cowasji Jehangir Readymoney Sir, (1812–1878): 1st Baronet, philanthropist, including various academic buildings of the Bombay University
 Cyrus Chothia (1942–2019): molecular biologist
 Cyrus Pallonji Mistry (1968-2022): former chairman of Tata Group; Irish citizen businessman
 Cyrus Poonawalla (born 1945): Indian Industrialist, pharmacologist; co-founder of the Serum Institute of India
 Dhunjibhoy Bomanji, Sir (1862–1937): Indian Shipping Magnate, philanthropist
 Dinshaw Maneckji Petit, Sir (1823–1901): founded the first textile factories in India
 Dorabji Tata, Sir (1859–1932): Indian industrialist and philanthropist, Sir Dorab Tata Trust
 Fardunjee Marzban (1787–1847): publisher, founded the first vernacular newspaper on the Indian subcontinent Bombay Samachar
 Feroze Gandhi (1912–1960) publisher of The National Herald and The Navjivan newspapers and husband of Indira Gandhi Prime Minister of India
 Framji Cowasji Banaji, Esq (1767 – 12 February 1851): merchant, philanthropist, lease holder of Powai
 Homi Jehangir Bhabha (1909–1966): nuclear scientist and first chairman of the Indian Atomic Energy Commission
 Homi Maneck Mehta, Sir (1871–1948): industrialist in textiles, insurance, banking, chemicals & sugar. Represented India at League of Nations, Chairman of Bombay War Gift Fund and President of Victory Thanksgiving Fund.
 Homi Nusserwanji Sethna (1923–2010): Padma Vibhushan awardee, chemical engineer; guided the development of India's first nuclear explosive device
 Sir Hormusjee Naorojee Mody (1838–1911): financier and industrialist in Hong Kong. He contributed $150,000 to help establish the University of Hong Kong.
 Sir Temulji Bhicaji Nariman (1848–1940): obstetrician. Co-founded one of Bombay's first Lying-in hospitals in 1887 and was knighted in 1914 for his work during the plague epidemic in India at the turn of the 19th century.
 Jehangir Ratanji Dadabhoy (J. R. D.) Tata (1904–1993): industrialist; founder of Air India, India's first commercial airline
 Jamsetji Jeejeebhoy, Sir (1783–1859): opened sea trade with China; philanthropist, J J Hospital,
 Jamsetji Tata (1839–1904): industrialist; founder of the Tata Group of companies, titled a "One-Man Planning Commission" by Jawaharlal Nehru
 Jehangir Ghandy, Sir (1896–1972): built Tata Steel at Jamshedpur
 Jehangir Hormusjee Ruttonjee (1880–1960): industrialist; founded Hong Kong's first brewery; established the first anti-tuberculosis sanatorium in the Andajat
 Lovji Nusserwanjee Wadia (1702–1774): shipwright and naval architect; builder of the first dry-dock in Asia
 Nadirshaw Edulji Dinshaw (18??–1924?): industrialist and philanthropist; NED Engineering College
 Nariman Mehta (1920–2014): organic chemist and inventor of bupropion, the most commonly used antidepressant drug
 Nergis Mavalvala (born 1968): astrophysicist and professor at MIT
 Neville Wadia (1911–1996): businessman and son-in-law of Muhammad Ali Jinnah
 Nusli Wadia (born 1944): chairman of the Wadia Group
 Ness Wadia (born 1972): joint-managing director of Bombay Dyeing
 Noshir Gowadia (born 1944): aircraft engineer and convicted spy
 Nowroji Saklatwala (1875–1938): Chairman of Tata group of companies from 1932 until death by heart attack in 1938
 Pallonji Mistry (born 1929): construction tycoon
 Pirojsha Burjorji Godrej (1882–1972): entrepreneur; co-founder (with his brother Ardeshir) of the Godrej industrial empire
 Ratan Tata (born 1937): chairman emeritus of Tata Sons; former chairman of the Tata Group of companies; member of the central board of the Reserve Bank of India
 Russi Mody (1918–2014): former Chairman and Managing Director of Tata Steel Limited; son of Sir Homi Mody and brother of Piloo Mody
 Rustom Jal Vakil (1911–1974): cardiologist 
 Ratanji Dadabhoy Tata (1856–1926): a noted chairperson of Tata Group and Tata Sons; father of J. R. D. Tata
 Sir Sorabji Nusserwanji Pochkhanawala (1881–1937): banker, co-founder of the Central Bank of India
 Shiraz Minwalla (born 1972): theoretical physicist, String theorist
 Spenta R. Wadia (born 1950): theoretical physicist
 Ratanji Tata (1871–1918), Sir: younger son of Jamsetji Tata; industrialist and philanthropist; Sir Ratan Tata Trust
 Villoo Morawala-Patell (born 1955), MD of Avesthagen: Officer of the National Order of Merit holder

In academia

 Homi K. Bhabha (born 1949): cultural-studies theorist; Professor, Harvard University
 Jamshed Bharucha (born 1956): President, Cooper Union. Formerly, Dean of the Faculty of Arts & Sciences at Dartmouth College (first Indian American to serve as the dean of a school at an Ivy League institution)
 Mahzarin Banaji (born 1956): Professor of Psychology, Harvard University
 Noshir Contractor (born 1959): Award-winning Professor of Behavioral Sciences, Communication and Management at Northwestern University
 Rusi Taleyarkhan: Professor of Nuclear Engineering at Purdue University
 Rohinton Kamakaka: Professor of Molecular Cell Developmental biology at University of California, Santa Cruz
 Thrity Umrigar (born 1961): Armitage Professor of English at Case Western Reserve University
 N. H. Wadia (1925–2016): Prominent neurologist; Director of Neurology at Grant Medical College and Sir J. J. Group of Hospitals for 25 years
 Vistasp Karbhari: President, University of Texas at Arlington
Homi Kharas: deputy director for the global economy and development program at the Brookings Institution
Ness B. Shroff: Ohio Eminent Scholar of Networking and Communications, and Chaired Professor of Electrical and Computer Engineering and Computer Science and Engineering at The Ohio State University

Military

 Field Marshal Sam Manekshaw (1914–2008): Former Indian Chief of Army Staff and the first Indian with the rank of Field Marshal
 Lieutenant General FN Billimoria (1933–2005): Former Indian Army officer and head of Wellington Cantonment, father of Indo-British entrepreneur Karan Bilimoria, Lord Bilimoria
 Admiral Jal Cursetji (1919–1991): Former Chief of the Naval Staff, Indian Navy
 Air Marshal Aspy Engineer (1912–2002): Former Chief of the Air Staff, Indian Air Force
 Air Marshal Minoo Merwan Engineer (1921–1997): Former Indian Air Force AOC-in-Chief of Eastern and Western Air Commands
 Vice Admiral Rustom K. S. Ghandhi (1924–2014): Indian Navy Commander-in-Chief, Western Naval Command and former Aide-de-camp to Governor-General of India Lord Louis Mountbatten
 Kavasji Jamshedji Petigara (1877–1941): First Indian Deputy Commissioner of the Mumbai Police
 Lieutenant General Adi M. Sethna (died 2006): Former Vice Chief of the Army Staff, Indian Army
 J. P. B. Jeejeebhoy (1891–1950), first Indian pilot in the Royal Flying Corps
 Lieutenant Colonel Ardeshir Tarapore (1923–1965):, Indian Army officer and commanding officer of the Poona Horse, winner of the Param Vir Chakra, India's highest award for gallantry
 Air Chief Marshal Fali Homi Major (born 1947): Former Chief of the Air Staff of the Indian Air Force
 Major General Cyrus Addie Pithawalla (born 1957): Recipient of the Ashoka Chakra

In entertainment, religion, sports

 Aban Marker Kabraji (born 1953): Pakistani ecologist, Asian regional director of IUCN
 Amyra Dastur (born 1993): model, film actress, television presenter
 Alaya Furniturewala (born 1998): model and film actresses 
 Aneela Mirza, or Anila Mirza (born 8 October 1974), Danish singer who has found success as a member of the pop group Toy-Box and as a solo artist under the name of Aneela
 Ardeshir Cowasjee (1926–2012): investigative journalist and newspaper columnist
\* Bapsi Sidhwa (born 1938): author and screenwriter; vocal proponent of women's rights
 Behram "Busybee" Contractor (1930–2001): journalist and columnist
 Behramji Malabari (1853–1912): poet, publicist, author, and social reformer
 Bejan Daruwalla (1931-2020): astrologer
 Burjor Khurshedji Karanjia (1919–2012): Indian film journalist and editor, chairman NFDC
 Cyrus Broacha (born 1971): MTV India VJ and stand-up comedian
 Cyrus Poncha (born 1976): Asian Squash Federation Junior Coach of the Year 2003–04
 Deena M. Mistri (1924–2011): author and educationalist; recipient of Pakistan's "Pride of Performance" medal
 Diana Eduljee (born 1956): first captain of the Indian women's Cricket team – from 1978 till 1993
 Diana Penty (born 1985): actress and model
 Dinyar Contractor: Parsi stage actor, Comedian and Bollywood actor
 Dolly Nazir (born 1935): swimmer
 Erick Avari (born 1952): Hollywood actor.
 Farokh Engineer (born 1938): cricketer.
 Farrukh Dhondy (born 1944): novelist, short story writer, screenwriter, journalist.
 Firdaus Kanga (born 1960): author, actor and screenwriter.
 Freddie Mercury (Farrokh Bulsara, 1946–1991): rock icon and lead singer for Queen.
 Fredoon Kabraji (1897–1986): poet, writer, journalist, and artist writing in English.
 Gary Lawyer (born 1959): singer-songwriter 
 Godrej Sidhwa (1925-2011): theologian and historian.
 Goshpi Avari (born 19??): first Pakistani woman to win a gold medal at the Asian Games.
 Homai Vyarawalla (1913–2012): India's first woman photojournalist, Padma Vibhushan.
 Homi Adajania (born 1972): Film Director, Writer and Scuba Diving Instructor
 Jamshedji Sorab Kukadaru (1831-1900): priest and ascetic 
 Jehan Daruvala (born 1998): Indian racing driver.
 Jim Sarbh (born 1987): actor on film, stage and television.
 Jivanji Jamshedji Modi Sir: Zoroastrian scholar, Ph.D from Heidelberg, Germany, recognition and awards, for scholarship, from Sweden, France, and Hungary.
 John Abraham: Bollywood actor with a Parsi-Christian background
 Kaikhosru Shapurji Sorabji (1892–1988): composer, music critic, pianist, and writer.
 Kaizad Gustad (born 1968): film director.
 Karl Umrigar (1960–1979): Indian jockey
 Keki Daruwalla (born 1937): poet and writer
 Maneckji Nusserwanji Dhalla (1875–1956): high priest and religious scholar.
 Mehli Mehta (1908–2002): musician; founder of the Bombay Philharmonic and Bombay String Orchestras.
 Mehr Jesia (born 1968): Indian model
 Nariman "Nari" Contractor (born 1934): cricketer; coach at the CCI Academy.
 Nauheed Cyrusi (born 1982): model, film actress, television presenter
 Nazneen Contractor (born 1982): film actress
 Nina Wadia (born 1968): British-Indian comedian and television actress, currently and most notably from EastEnders.
 Perizaad Zorabian (born 1973): model, film actress
 Persis Khambatta (1950–1998): actress and model. Miss India in 1965.
 Phiroz Mehta (1902–1994): writer on religious topics and philosopher.
 Pahlan Ratanji "Polly" Umrigar (1926–2006): cricketer.
 Rachel Viccaji Pakistani singer and musician.
 Rashid Byramji Horse trainer
 Rohinton Mistry (born 1952): novelist, short story author, screenplay writer.
 Rustom Khurshedji Karanjia (1912–2008): journalist & editor, founder of India's first tabloid, Blitz.
 Sanaya Pithawalla (born 1993): actress, TV personality.
 Sam Dastor (born 1941): television actor and director.
 Shapur Kharegat (1932–2000): journalist, editor and director of The Economist (Asia).
 Shiamak Davar (born 1961): Bollywood choreographer
 Sohrab Modi (1897–1984): stage and film actor, director and producer.
 Sooni Taraporevala (born 1957): screenwriter, author and photographer.
 Tara Sutaria (born 1995): actress.
 Varun Toorkey (born 1990): television and film actor.
 Viraf Phiroz Patel (born 1980): The Grasim Mr. India 2005, model turned actor
 Zarin Mehta (born 1938): musician; executive director of the New York Philharmonic since 2000
 Zarnak Sidhwa (born 1972): Pakistani Chef with a TV show on Masala TV.
 Zerbanoo Gifford (born 1950): human rights campaigner
 Zoe Viccaji (born 1983): Pakistani singer and musician
 Zubin Mehta (born 1936): musician; Musical Director for Life of the Israel Philharmonic Orchestra and Maggio Musicale Fiorentino, former director of the Los Angeles Philharmonic, New York Philharmonic and Bavarian State Opera.
 Zubin Surkari (born 1980): Canadian international cricketer.
 Zubin Varla (born 1970): stage actor.

Politicians, activists and bureaucrats
 

 B. P. Wadia (1881–1958), Indian theosophist and labour activist. Pioneered the creation of workers unions in India.
 Cowasji Jehangir (Readymoney) (1812–1878): J.P.; introduced income tax in India; first baronet of Bombay.
 Frene Ginwala (born 1932): member of the ANC and aided Nelson Mandela in abolishing apartheid in South Africa. Later served for 7 years as Speaker Of the House of Parliament in South Africa
 Jamshed Nusserwanjee Mehta (1886–1952): former Mayor of Karachi for 12 consecutive years.
 Jamsheed Marker (1922–2018): Pakistani diplomat, ambassador to more countries than any other person; recipient of Hilal-i Imtiaz.
 Justice Dorab Patel (1924–1997): former Chief Justice of Sindh High Court, former Justice of Supreme Court of Pakistan and human rights campaigner.
 K. N. Choksy (1933–2015): Minister of Finance of Sri Lanka
 Mancherjee Bhownagree (1851–1933): politician, second Asian to be elected to the House of Commons (Conservative).
 Minocher Bhandara (1937?–2008): Pakistani parliamentarian and owner of Muree Brewery.
 Minoo Masani (1905–1998): author, parliamentarian and a member of the Constituent Assembly.
 Piloo Mody (1926–1983): architect, parliamentarian, one of the founder-members of the Swatantra Party.
 Rustam S. Sidhwa (1927–1997): judge on the Supreme Court of Pakistan as well as one of the original eleven judges of the International Criminal Tribunal for the former Yugoslavia.
 Sanjay Gandhi (1946–1980): the younger son of Indira Gandhi and Feroz Gandhi, who followed his father's Parsi religion throughout his life.
 Shapurji Saklatvala (1874–1936): socialist, workers' welfare activist, third Asian to be elected to the House of Commons (Communist, Labour).
 Zerbanoo Gifford (born 1950): author and founder of the ASHA Centre made political history being elected as the first non-white woman for the Liberal Party in 1982.
 Kobad Ghandy (born 1951): communist ideologue, affiliated with the  Communist Party of India (Maoist), political prisoner from 2009-2019.

Indian independence movement

 Bhikaiji Cama (1861–1936): political activist, co-creator of the Indian nationalist flag.
 Dadabhai Naoroji (1825–1917): economist, political activist, first Asian to be elected to the House of Commons of the United Kingdom (Liberal), first to publicly demand independence for India.
 Feroze Gandhi (1912–1960): journalist and politician; Indian MP under his father-in-law Jawaharlal Nehru; husband of Indira Gandhi, father of Rajiv Gandhi and Sanjay Gandhi, and grandfather of Rahul Gandhi, Priyanka Gandhi and Varun Gandhi.
 Khurshed Framji Nariman (18??–19??): social activist, Mayor of Bombay. Member of the Indian National Congress.
 Pherozeshah Mehta, Sir (1845–1915): political activist, co-founder and a President of the Indian National Congress, founder of the Bombay Municipal Corporation

Law

 Dinshah Fardunji Mulla (born 1868): Indian author of legal reference books, appointed a Privy Counsellor in 1930, assistant editor of Pollock’s Commentaries on Indian Contract Act
 Fali Sam Nariman (born 1929): jurist, recipient of the Padma Bhushan and Padma Vibhushan
 Jamshed Burjor Pardiwala (born 1965): judge of the Supreme Court of India since May 2022. He was part of the majority of the Constitution bench which upheld the 103rd Constitutional amendment of Economically Weaker Sections (EWS) reservation, which is considered a major breakthrough.
 Nanabhoy ("Nani") Palkhivala (1920–2002): prominent jurist and economist
 S. H. Kapadia (1947–2016): 38th Chief Justice of India
 Sam Piroj Bharucha (born 1937): 30th Chief Justice of India
 Soli Jehangir Sorabjee (born 1930-2021): former Attorney-General of India
 Hormasji Maneckji Seervai (1906–1996): eminent Indian jurist
 T. R. Andhyarujina (1933–2017): senior advocate
 Cornelia Sorabji (1866–1954): first female graduate of Bombay University, first female to read law at Oxford University and first woman to practice law in India and Britain
 Rohinton Fali Nariman (born 1956): Judge, Supreme Court of India; Delhi University; Harvard University
 Shiavax Jal Vazifdar (born 1956): Chief Justice, Punjab and Haryana High Court
 Karl Jamshed Khandalavala (1904–1995): the defence lawyer of KM Nanavati in the case of K. M. Nanavati v. State of Maharashtra
 Neomi Rao (born 1973): circuit judge of United States Court of Appeals for the District of Columbia Circuit, former Administrator of the Office of Information and Regulatory Affairs (converted to Judaism)

Others

 Bhicaji Balsara (1872–1962): first Indian to become a naturalized US Citizen
 Bukhtyar Rustomji (1899–1936): Mumbai-born Lancaster doctor executed for murdering his wife and a maid
 Dossabhoy Muncherji Raja (1873–1947): first Indian to be appointed appraiser of precious stones to British Indian customs. Awarded the title of Khan Sahib
Lady Frainy Dhunjibhoy Bomanji (14 September 1893 – 1986): Lady Harrogate, philanthropist, Honorary Freemanship of the Borough in 1984
 Jimmy Bharucha (died 2005): Sri Lankan broadcaster
 Keiki R. Mehta: ophthalmologist and Padma Shri awardee
 Neville J Bilimoria: businessman and philanthropist
 Rattanbai Petit (1900–1929): second wife of Muhammad Ali Jinnah
 Goshpi Avari: Asian Games gold-medalist and Pride of Performance honorary
 Jehangir Hormasji Kothari (1857–1934): philanthropist and world traveller.

In arts

 Fredoon Kabraji (1897–1986): poet
 Hormazd Narielwalla (born 1979): collage artist and author, based in London
 Jehangir Sabavala (1922–2011): painter
 Karl Keki Singporewala (born 1983): architect & sculptor
 Shirin Darasha (1938–2012): playwright

Fictional characters 
 The Cake "Parsee" (colloquial British spelling of Parsi) in "How the Rhinoceros Got His Skin", a chapter in Rudyard Kipling's Just So Stories. Kipling names him as Pestonjee Bomonjee in the illustration accompanying the story.

See also
 Irani

 List of Zoroastrians

References

 
Parsis
List of Parsis
Par